The 2007 World Judo Championships are the 25th edition of the Judo World Championships, and were held at the Rio Olympic Arena, usually called Arena Multiuso, that was built for the 2007 Pan-American Games, in Jacarepaguá, Rio de Janeiro, Brazil from September 13 to September 16, 2007.

The competition gathered the sport's top athletes in Rio de Janeiro, with only a few exceptions, due to injuries.  Among the high-profile injured judokas that were unable to participate were Brazil's Flávio Canto, bronze medallist in the -81 kg category at the 2004 Summer Olympic Games, who tore a ligament in his right elbow during the 2007 Pan American Games (during the event, Canto participated as a commentator for the Brazilian paid sports channel, SporTV); and Japan's Tadahiro Nomura, the three-time Olympic champion and heavy favorite in the -60 kg category was forced to withdraw only a few weeks before the event due to injury (his replacement was able to place 7th in the competition).

In the leadup to the event, Rio de Janeiro also hosted the IJF's International Congress, congregating the heads of all the national confederations affiliated to the IJF.  The meeting took place on September 12, eve of the first day of competition, and in it, some important decisions were made.  The first was the election of the new IJF president.  Marius Vizer was elected by the attending representatives to replace Yung Sang Park, the current president.  In addition, the Congress voted and approved unanimously, the extension of the IJF's president term from 2 years to 6 years. Another decision made in the meeting was the selection of the city that would host the 2011 World Championship.  The contenders were the cities of Paris, France and Hamburg, Germany, and the French capital was selected as the host city for the 2011 event.  Finally, the Congress also voted on the new presidency of the European Judo Union, with Russia's Sergei Soloveychik being elected president and Jean-Luc Rougé and Vladimír Bárta being elected as first vice president and vice president respectively.  Newly appointed IJF president, Marius Vizer, was made honorary president of the European Judo Federation as well.

After the conclusion of competition in the last day of the event, the IJF members voted on the best athletes of the World Championship.  In the men's side, Brazil's Tiago Camilo, who won in the -81 kg category by defeating all opponents by ippon (the perfect score, which ends the match automatically), was selected; and in the women's side, North Korea's Kye Sun-hui, who won in the -57 kg category, was chosen as best female athlete in the competition.  Both athletes were presented with an obelisk-shaped, acrylic trophy for the achievement.

Medal overview

Men

Women

Medal table

Results overview

Men

60 kg
16 September – Final

66 kg
15 September – Final

73 kg
15 September – Final

81 kg
14 September – Final

90 kg
14 September – Final

100 kg
13 September – Final

+100 kg
13 September – Final

Open class
16 September – Final

Women

48 kg
16 September – Final

52 kg
15 September – Final

57 kg
15 September – Final

63 kg
14 September – Final

70 kg
14 September – Final

78 kg
13 September – Final

+78 kg
13 September – Final

Open class
16 September – Final

External links

 Official site
 
 USA Judo
 World Championships 2007 Video material

W
J
World Judo Championships
Judo
International sports competitions in Rio de Janeiro (city)
Judo competitions in Brazil